Edward Eugene Van Buren (December 14, 1870 in LaSalle County, Illinois – June 29, 1957 in Portland, Oregon), was a professional baseball player who played outfield during the 1904 season.

External links

1870 births
1957 deaths
Major League Baseball outfielders
Brooklyn Superbas players
Philadelphia Phillies players
Lincoln Treeplanters players
Cedar Rapids Bunnies players
Cedar Rapids Rabbits players
Omaha Omahogs players
St. Joseph Saints players
New Castle Quakers players
Youngstown Little Giants players
Columbus Senators players
Portland Webfoots players
Portland Browns players
Kansas City Blues (baseball) players
San Francisco Seals (baseball) players
Portland Giants players
Seattle Siwashes players
Aberdeen Black Cats players
Aberdeen Grays players
Aberdeen Harbor Grays players
Oakland Commuters players
Santa Cruz Sand Crabs players
Sacramento Sacts players
Sacramento Solons managers
Sacramento Wolves players
Mission Wolves players
Baseball players from Illinois